1,4-Dimethylnaphthalene (1,4DMN) is a plant growth regulator that occurs naturally in potato tubers, preventing them from sprouting.  Synthetic forms such as 1-4SIGHT are applied to potatoes during storage.

Although discovered in the 1970s, it was not used commercially in the USA until 1996 and in Europe until the 2010s.

References

Plant growth regulators
Naphthalenes
Aromatic hydrocarbons